Kungyangon Township is a township of Yangon Region. It is located in the southwestern part of the Region, by the Andaman Sea.

References 

Townships of Yangon Region